Mirabad (also Romanized as Mīrābād) is a village in Sumay-ye Shomali Rural District, Sumay-ye Beradust District, Urmia County, West Azerbaijan Province, Iran. At the 2006 census, its population was 342, in 49 families.

References 

Populated places in Urmia County